Ishmukhametovo (İşmöxämät) is a rural locality (a selo) and the administrative centre of Ishmukhametovsky Selsoviet, Baymaksky District, Bashkortostan, Russia. The population was 526 as of 2010. There are 8 streets.

Geography 
Ishmukhametovo is located 37 km southeast of Baymak (the district's administrative centre) by road. Yangazino is the nearest rural locality.

References 

Rural localities in Baymaksky District